Federal Bureau of Prisons Program Statements are the policy documents of the Federal Bureau of Prisons (FBOP).  They are promulgated by the FBOP director and FBOP staff are expected to adhere to them.

There are eight series of program statements dealing with various subjects. The Program Statements represent the internal policies of the Federal Bureau of Prisons, and often quote the United States Code and Code of Federal Regulations and provide the FBOP's interpretations of these laws and regulations and procedures for implementing them.

Series

References

Federal Bureau of Prisons
Government documents of the United States
United States administrative law
Bureau of Prisons Program Statements